Nobody's Perfect may refer to:

Film and television 
 Nobody's Perfect (1968 film), a naval comedy film
 Nobody's Perfect (1990 film), a comedy film starring Chad Lowe
 Nobody's Perfect (2004 film), a short film by Hank Azaria
 Nobody's Perfect (2008 film), a Hong Kong film of 2008
 Nobody's Perfect (American TV series), a 1980 sitcom
 Nobody's Perfect (British TV series), a 1980–1982 adaptation of the American sitcom Maude
 "Nobody's Perfect" (Degrassi High), an episode of Degrassi High
 NoBody's Perfect, a 2008 documentary film about people with phocomelia

Literature 
 Nobody's Perfect, a 2011 baseball book by Armando Galarraga and Jim Joyce with Daniel Paisner about Galarraga's near-perfect game
 Nobody's Perfect, a 2002 book by Anthony Lane
 Nobody's Perfect, a 2006 children's novel by Marlee Matlin
 Nobody's Perfect, a 1977 novel in the John Dortmunder series by Donald E. Westlake
 Nobody's Perfect, a 1982 novel by Jacqueline Wilson

Music

Albums 

 Nobody's Perfect (Deep Purple album), 1988
 Nobody's Perfect (The Distractions album), 1980

Songs 

 "Nobody's Perfect" (Hannah Montana song), 2007
 "Nobody's Perfect" (J. Cole song), 2012
 "Nobody's Perfect" (Jessie J song), 2011
 "Nobody's Perfect", a song by Chris Brown
 "Nobody's Perfect", a song by the Fall of Troy from In the Unlikely Event
 "Nobody's Perfect", a song by Kōji Kikkawa
 "Nobody's Perfect", a song by Madonna from Music
 "Nobody's Perfect", a song by Mike + The Mechanics from Living Years

See also 
 "Well, nobody's perfect", the well-known last line of the 1959 film Some Like It Hot
 Nobody's Perfekt, a 1981 comedy film